The men's decathlon at the 1950 European Athletics Championships was held in Brussels, Belgium, at Heysel Stadium on 24 and 25 August 1950.

Medalists

Results

Final
24/25 August

Participation
According to an unofficial count, 15 athletes from 10 countries participated in the event.

 (2)
 (1)
 (2)
 (1)
 (1)
 (2)
 (2)
 (1)
 (1)
 (2)

References

Decathlon
Combined events at the European Athletics Championships